Barzu may refer to:

Bârz, a river in Romania
, a Romanian name for Podilsk in Ukraine
Barzu, North Khorasan, a village in Iran

See also
 Borzu (disambiguation)